Joseph A. Stockton  was a prominent Presbyterian minister in Western Pennsylvania. He founded Meadville Academy, which later became Allegheny College in Meadville, Pennsylvania.  He was also President of University of Pittsburgh.

He attended Jefferson College in Canonsburg, Pennsylvania and was tutored by John McMillan.
He was an early member of the Philo Literary Society.

He worked for a time as an assistant tutor at Jefferson College.

He also taught grammar and mathematics at Allegheny Academy in Allegheny, Pennsylvania, now Pittsburgh's North Side, with Mr. Caldwell teaching elocution and John Kelly of Dublin, Ireland as disciplinarian; Kelly later continued the school after Stockton's death.  Stockton authored the Western Calculator and Western Spelling Book, used at the Academy as textbooks.  His most famous student at the Academy was Stephen Foster, later America's first professional composer, and Foster's brother Morrison described Stockton as: "a perfect tutor.  He was learned, he was firm, he was amiable, and he was thorough and practical."

References

Washington & Jefferson College faculty
Washington & Jefferson College alumni
Chancellors of the University of Pittsburgh